Gabriel Ramushwana (1 July 1941 – 12 January 2015) was a head of state of the Bantustan of Venda. He joined the SAP in Welkom as a Constable in 1960 and was seconded to the SADF 112 Infantry Battalion as a Warrant Officer in 1973. After being rushed through SADF OCS, he was commissioned as a Lieutenant and a Company 2 i/c  in 112 Infantry Battalion in 1977. Promoted to Captain in 1980 and made Battalion Intelligence Officer. He was made the CO of the 1 Venda Battalion in 1981 and the deputy commanding officer of the Venda Defence Force in 1984. On 5 April 1990 he led the overthrow of the democratically elected government of President Frank Ravele and established a military government. Ramushwana died on 12 January 2015 at the age of 73.

References

1941 births
2015 deaths
Heads of state of Venda
South African Venda people
Leaders who took power by coup
South African military personnel